Jimmy Boyd Wilkerson (born January 4, 1981) is a former American football defensive end. He was drafted by the Kansas City Chiefs in the sixth round of the 2003 NFL Draft. He played college football at Oklahoma.

Wilkerson has also played for the Tampa Bay Buccaneers, New Orleans Saints and Seattle Seahawks

College career
He played in 38 games (24 starts) at the University of Oklahoma, amassing 130 tackles, 35 stops for loss, 12.0 sacks 28 quarterback pressures, 13 passes defensed and four forced fumbles.

Professional career

Kansas City Chiefs
Jimmy Wilkerson played for the Kansas City Chiefs from 2003–2007. On March 18, 2007, Wilkerson re-signed with the Chiefs for a one-year contract.

Tampa Bay Buccaneers
On March 1, 2008, he signed a two-year deal with the Tampa Bay Buccaneers. He started one of 16 games played in 2008, recording 23 tackles, 5.0 sacks and a forced fumble.

Wilkerson moved into the starting lineup in 2009, starting all 15 games in which he played for the Buccaneers that season. He suffered a torn ACL against the New Orleans Saints on December 27 and was placed on season-ending injured reserve the following day. Wilkerson finished the 2009 season with career highs in tackles (46), sacks (6.0) and forced fumbles (two).

New Orleans Saints
On April 20, 2010, Wilkerson signed with the New Orleans Saints.

Seattle Seahawks
Wilkerson signed with the Seattle Seahawks on August 2, 2011.

References

External links
 New Orleans Saints bio

1981 births
Living people
People from Mount Pleasant, Texas
Players of American football from Texas
American football defensive tackles
American football defensive ends
Oklahoma Sooners football players
Kansas City Chiefs players
Tampa Bay Buccaneers players
New Orleans Saints players
Seattle Seahawks players
Texas A&M–Commerce Lions football coaches